This list documents Britain's best-selling music artists alphabetically as well as by record sales. This page lists those artists who have had claims of over one million or more records in sales. The list is divided into numerous record-sales brackets within each of which, artists are listed in alphabetical order, rather than by number of records sold. The artists on the list are supported by third-party reliable sources, the sales-figures within which should represent a total number of sold albums, singles, compilation-albums, music videos as well as downloads of singles and full-length albums.
This list holds no account of sales after the initial release dates, some artists keep on selling albums they originally released for instance in 1972. those albums sold over the years in their millions.

Constraints
Although the criteria for the following list are intended to be expansive (including comparisons for total-sales for all recording artists) there are certain limitations and constraints that may limit the conclusions that can be derived from these data.
There is no certainty these figures are correct for not all sales are controllable.

Such constraints include:

 Bias towards acts who have had success in a specific country or region.
 Bias towards older artists.  There is a broader genre spectrum of music to listen to now which limits the number of listeners.
 Bias towards modern artists.  Comparatively fewer successful pre-modern artists will have sold more records, as both global spending power and population have increased.  In 1950, the world's population was 2.5 billion; by 2000 it had risen to 6 billion.  Also, older artists suffer from bias as their record sales are less likely to have been accurately tracked, and estimates of their early sales are likely to be more vague.
 Fan sites, press articles and record labels have been known to inflate record sales claims.
 Inflated claims for artists who performed in different acts during their careers. Sometimes all of the sales data is attributed to an individual artist. For the purposes of this list, an effort is made to separate the individual acts (e.g., the sales figures for The Beatles and Paul McCartney & Wings are mutually exclusive).

400 million or more records

300 million to 400 million records

200 million to 299 million records

100 million to 199 million records

50 to 99 million records

See also
 List of best-selling music artists
 List of best-selling music artists in the United States

References 

Lists of musicians
British music-related lists
United Kingdom-related lists of superlatives